The 1992 Harlow District Council election took place on 7 May 1992 to elect members of Harlow District Council in Essex, England. This was on the same day as other local elections. The Labour Party retained control of the council, which it had held continuously since the council's creation in 1973.

Election result

All comparisons in vote share are to the corresponding 1988 election.

Ward results

Brays Grove

Great Parndon

Hare Street and Town Centre

Kingsmoor

Latton Bush

Little Parndon

Mark Hall South

Netteswell East

Netteswell West

Old Harlow

Passmores

Potter Street

Stewards

Tye Green

References

1992
1992 English local elections
1990s in Essex